Black ant can refer to:

Biology
A term used for eusocial insects of the family Formicidae that are black in color. It has been used to describe many ants, including:
 The Black carpenter ant (Camponotus pennsylvanicus)
 The Black garden ant (Lasius niger)
 The Little black ant (Monomorium minimum)

 Some ant mimics look like black ants (see Ant mimicry)

Other uses
 Black Ant, a Marvel Comics character who is a Life Model Decoy of Eric O'Grady

See also
 Ant
 List of ant genera (alphabetical)
 Ant (disambiguation), another ant-related disambiguation page